The Show! Music Core Chart is a record chart on the South Korean MBC television music program Show! Music Core. Every week, the show awards the best-performing single on the chart in the country during its live broadcast.

In 2022, 21 singles achieved number one on the chart, and 17 acts were awarded first-place trophies. "Beatbox" by NCT Dream had the highest score of the year, with 9,800 points on the June 11 broadcast. Taeyeon's "INVU" and Ive's "After Like" won four trophies each, making both singles the most-awarded songs of the year. "Eleven" and "After Like" by Ive spent a combined total of seven weeks atop the chart, making them the most awarded act of 2022.

Chart history

See also 
List of Show! Music Core Chart winners (2021)

References 

2022 in South Korean music
South Korea Show Music Core
Lists of number-one songs in South Korea